Events in the year 2020 in Trinidad and Tobago.

Incumbents
 President: Paula-Mae Weekes
 Prime Minister: Keith Rowley
 Chief Justice: Ivor Archie

Events

19 January – The 2020 Tobago Council of the People's National Movement leadership election is won by Tracy Davidson-Celestine.
12 March – First confirmed case of COVID-19 in Trinidad and Tobago

10 August – The 2020 Trinidad and Tobago general election was held to elect 41 members to the 12th Trinidad and Tobago Republican Parliament.

Deaths

14 March – Cecil Gray, Trinidadian-born Canadian poet (b. 1923).
16 April – Althea McNish, Trinidadian-British textile designer (b. 1924).
8 June – Sedley Joseph, footballer (b. 1939).
4 July – James Lee Wah, 89, theatre promoter and educator.
15 September – Sheldon Gomes, 69, cricketer (North Trinidad, East Trinidad, national team).

See also
COVID-19 pandemic in Trinidad and Tobago

References

 
2020s in Trinidad and Tobago
Years of the 21st century in Trinidad and Tobago
Trinidad and Tobago
Trinidad and Tobago